Sama is an album by American jazz pianist Matthew Shipp and reedist Sabir Mateen, which was recorded in 2009 and released on the Polish Not Two label. This eight part suite of completely improvised music was the first collaboration between Shipp and Mateen.

Reception
In a double review for All About Jazz, John Sharpe notes that "Mateen forgoes his regular reed arsenal to concentrate solely on clarinet. Perhaps the chamber instrumentation exerted an influence on both men's thinking as Shipp somewhat reins in his customary hammered repetitions and motifs, emphasizing his brooding romantic side."

Track listing
All compositions by Sabir Mateen & Matthew Shipp
 "Sama One" - 8:26
 "Sama Two" - 5:56
 "Sama Three" - 3:55
 "Sama Four" - 7:37
 "Sama Five" - 8:47
 "Sama Six" - 4:34
 "Sama Seven" - 6:16
 "Sama Eight" - 4:04

Personnel
 Matthew Shipp – piano
 Sabir Mateen - clarinet

References

2010 albums
Sabir Mateen albums
Matthew Shipp albums